Courts of California include:
;State courts of record of California
Supreme Court of California
California Courts of Appeal (6 appellate districts)
Superior Courts of California (58 courts, one for each county)

;State quasi-administrative courts of California
 State Bar Court of California; an administrative court within the judicial branch, subordinate to the California Supreme Court

Federal courts located in California
United States Court of Appeals for the Ninth Circuit (headquartered in San Francisco, having jurisdiction over the United States District Courts of Alaska, Arizona, California, Guam, Hawaii, Idaho, Montana, Nevada, the Northern Mariana Islands, Oregon, and Washington)
United States District Court for the Central District of California
United States District Court for the Eastern District of California
United States District Court for the Northern District of California
United States District Court for the Southern District of California

Former federal courts of California
United States District Court for the District of California (extinct, subdivided)

References

See also
 Judiciary of California

External links
National Center for State Courts - directory of state court websites.

Courts in the United States